Peter Jon Angelsen (born  6 February 1935) is a Norwegian politician for the Centre Party (SP). Born in Vestvågøy, Nordland, he represented the county in the Storting for four periods, from 1981 to 1997. He served as Minister of Fisheries in the first government of Kjell Magne Bondevik, from 1997, as well as minister of Nordic cooperation from 1999 until he resigned on 21 January 2000, to be replaced by Lars Peder Brekk. He was said to have resigned due to old age and wanting to let someone new take over.

References

External links

1935 births
Living people
Government ministers of Norway
Members of the Storting
Centre Party (Norway) politicians
20th-century Norwegian politicians
People from Vestvågøy